Donegi Abena (born February  23, 1998) is a Surinamese-Dutch kickboxer, currently competing in the Light Heavyweight division of Glory, where he is the current Glory Light Heavyweight champion.

He is ranked as the fourth best light heavyweight in the world by Combat Press as of September 2022, and fifth best by Beyond Kick as of October 2022. He's been ranked in the Combat Press top ten since November 2018, peaking at #4 between May and October 2019.

Kickboxing career

Early career
Abena made his professional debut against Elmir Mehić at WFL: Bosnia on September 25, 2015. He won the bout by split decision.

Abena was scheduled to face Jan Soukup at Večer Bojovníků Thajského Boxu VII on December 19, 2015. Soukup won the fight by unanimous decision. He was afterwards scheduled to face Petr Romankevich in the quarterfinals of the 2016 Tatneft Cup. He lost the fight by an extra round decision, thus entering the first losing streak of his career.

Abena snapped the losing streak with a first-round knockout of Maurice Jackson at FFC 25: Mitchell vs Lopez on June 10, 2016. Over the next six months, Abena would furthermore notch a knockout victory over Andrey Ohotnik on July 22, as well as decision victories against Dzhobir Tashmatov on August 23, and Andress van Engelen on November 5. This five-fight winning streak earned the a place in the 2016 WLF Super Heavyweight Tournament, held on December 3, 2016. He won the rematch with Petr Romankevich in the quarterfinals by decision, but lost to Jairzinho Rozenstruik by a first-round knockout in the finals.

Abena was scheduled to fight Fabien Fouquet at FFC 29 on April 22, 2017. Abena won the fight by a first-round technical knockout.

A1 World Combat Cup
On May 13, 2017, Abena took part in the A1 WCC Heavyweight Qualification Tournament. He won the semifinal match against Wendell Roche and the final match against Brian Douwes in the same manner, by decision.

Abena was scheduled to fight Clyde Brunswijk at Blood, Sweat and Tears on December 22, 2017. He won the fight by decision.

On May 5, 2018, Abena participated in the 2018 A1WCC Champions League Tournament, with a €110 000. Abena beat Luis Tavares by an extra round decision in the quarterfinal, Adnan Rezovic by decision in the semifinals and faced Mohamed Abdellah in the finals. Abdellah won the final bout by decision.

Abena was scheduled to face Andrei Stoica at ACB KB 16 on July 13, 2018.He won the fight by decision.

GLORY
Abena was scheduled to make his Glory debut against Stephane Susperregui at Glory 62: Rotterdam on December 8, 2018. Abena won the fight by unanimous decision, with one of the judges scoring the bout 30-27 in his favor, while three of the judges scored it as 29-28 for Abena.

Abena was scheduled to face the #4 ranked Glory light heavyweight Michael Duut at Glory 64: Strasbourg on March 9, 2019. Abena won the fight by split decision, with three judges scoring the bout in his favor (30-27, 29-28, 29-28) and two judges scoring the bout in Duut's favor (30-27, 29-28).

His two victories with the promotion left Abena as the top-ranked contender, earning him the right to challenge the reigning Glory Light Heavyweight champion Artem Vakhitov at Glory 66: Paris on June 22, 2019. Vakhitov won the fight by a split decision, with four of the judges scoring the fight for him (49-46, 49-46, 48-47, 48-47), while the last judge scored the bout 48-47 for Abena.

Abena was scheduled to face the reigning GLORY Middleweight champion Alex Pereira for the interim Glory Light Heavyweight Championship at Glory 68: Miami on September 28, 2019. Pereira won the fight by a third-round knockout, landing a left hook in the last minute of the round.

Abena returned from a 14-month layoff to face Luis Tavares at Glory 77: Rotterdam on January 30, 2021. Tavares won the fight by unanimous decision. Abena was scheduled to face Sergej Maslobojev at Glory: Collision 3 on October 23, 2021, in his second fight of the year. He lost the closely contested fight by split decision.

Abena faced the #2 ranked Glory light heavyweight contender Felipe Micheletti at Glory: Collision 4 on October 8, 2022. He won the fight by unanimous decision.

Glory Light Heavyweight champion
Abena challenged Sergej Maslobojev for the Glory Light Heavyweight Championship at Glory 83 on February 11, 2023. He won the fight by a fourth-round technical knockout. The fight was stopped by the ringside physician due to a cut on Maslobojev's shin.

Mixed martial arts career
Abena was expected to make his mixed martial arts debut against Paolo Anastasi at Ares FC 7: Abdouraguimov vs. Amoussou on June 25, 2022. The bout was later cancelled for undisclosed reasons.

Titles and accomplishments
GLORY
 2023 Glory Light Heavyweight Champion

Kickboxing record

|- style="background:#cfc;"
| 2023-02-11|| Win ||align=left| Sergej Maslobojev || Glory 83 || Essen, Germany || TKO (Doctor stoppage) || 4 || 2:15
|-
! style=background:white colspan=9 |
|-  bgcolor= "#cfc"
| 2022-10-08 || Win ||align=left| Felipe Micheletti || Glory: Collision 4 || Arnhem, Netherlands || Decision (Unanimous) ||3  ||3:00
|-
|-  bgcolor= "#FFBBBB"
| 2021-10-23|| Loss ||align=left| Sergej Maslobojev || Glory: Collision 3 || Arnhem, Netherlands || Decision (Split) || 3 || 3:00 
|-
|-  bgcolor= "#FFBBBB"
| 2021-01-30 || Loss||align=left| Luis Tavares || Glory 77: Rotterdam || Rotterdam, Netherlands || Decision (Unanimous) || 3 || 3:00 
|-
|-  bgcolor= "#FFBBBB"
| 2019-09-28|| Loss||align=left| Alex Pereira || Glory 68: Miami || Miami, United States || KO (Left Hook) || 3 || 2:08 
|-
! style=background:white colspan=9 |
|-  style="background:#FFBBBB;"
| 2019-06-22 || Loss ||align=left| Artem Vakhitov || Glory 66: Paris || Paris, France || Decision (Split) || 5 || 3:00 
|-
! style=background:white colspan=9 |
|-  bgcolor="#CCFFCC"
| 2019-03-09|| Win ||align=left| Michael Duut || Glory 64: Strasbourg || Strasbourg, France || Decision (split) || 3 || 3:00 
|-  bgcolor="#CCFFCC"
| 2018-12-08 || Win ||align=left| Stephane Susperregui || Glory 62: Rotterdam  || Rotterdam, Netherlands || Decision (Unanimous) || 3 || 3:00 
|-  bgcolor="#CCFFCC"
| 2018-07-13 || Win ||align=left| Andrei Stoica || ACB KB 16 || Târgoviște, Romania || Decision (Split) || 3 || 3:00 
|-  bgcolor="#FFBBBB"
| 2018-05-05 || Loss ||align=left| Mohamed Abdallah || A1WCC Champions League, Final || Hasselt, Belgium || Decision || 3 || 3:00 
|-
! style=background:white colspan=9 |
|-  bgcolor="#CCFFCC"
| 2018-05-05 || Win ||align=left| Adnan Rezovic || A1WCC Champions League, Semi Final || Hasselt, Belgium || Decision || 3 || 3:00 
|-  bgcolor="#CCFFCC"
| 2018-05-05 || Win ||align=left| Luis Tavares || A1WCC Champions League, Quarter Final || Hasselt, Belgium || Ext R. Decision (Unanimous) || 4 || 3:00 
|-  bgcolor="#CCFFCC"
| 2017-12-22 || Win ||align=left| Clyde Brunswijk || Blood, Sweat and Tears || Paramaribo, Suriname || Decision || 3 || 3:00 
|-  bgcolor="#CCFFCC"
| 2017-05-13 || Win ||align=left| Brian Douwes || A1 World Combat Cup,  Final || Eindhoven, Netherlands || Decision || 3 || 3:00 
|-
! style=background:white colspan=9 |
|-
|-  bgcolor="#CCFFCC"
| 2017-05-13 || Win ||align=left| Wendell Roche || A1 World Combat Cup, Semi Finals || Eindhoven, Netherlands || Decision || 3 || 3:00 
|-
|-  bgcolor="#CCFFCC"
| 2017-04-22 || Win ||align=left| Fabien Fouquet || FFC 29 || Ljubljana, Slovenia || TKO (Liver Shot) || 1 ||  2:35 
|-
|-  bgcolor="#FFBBBB"
| 2016-12-03 || Loss ||align=left| Jairzinho Rozenstruik || Wu Lin Feng 2016: WLF x Krush - China vs Japan || Zhengzhou, China || KO || 1 ||  
|-
! style=background:white colspan=9 |
|-
|-  bgcolor="#CCFFCC"
| 2016-12-03 || Win ||align=left| Petr Romankevich || Wu Lin Feng 2016: WLF x Krush - China vs Japan || Zhengzhou, China || Decision || 3 ||  3:00 
|-
|-  bgcolor="#CCFFCC"
| 2016-11-05 || Win || align=left| Andress van Engelen|| A1 World Combat Cup || Germany || Decision || 3 ||  3:00 
|-
|-  bgcolor="#CCFFCC"
| 2016-08-23 || Win || align=left| Dzhobir Tashmatov|| Akhmat Fight Show || Grozny, Russia || Decision (Unanimous) || 3 ||  3:00 
|-
|-  bgcolor="#CCFFCC" 
| 2016-07-22 || Win ||align=left| Andrey Ohotnik || Tatneft Cup 2016 - 1st selection 1/4 final || Kazan, Russia || KO || 2 ||  
|-
|-  bgcolor="#CCFFCC" 
| 2016-06-10 || Win ||align=left| Maurice Jackson || FFC 25: Mitchell vs Lopez || Springfield, Massachusetts, USA || TKO (punches) || 1 ||  1:10 
|-
|-  bgcolor="#FFBBBB"
| 2016-03-06 || Loss ||align=left| Petr Romankevich || Tatneft Cup 2016 - 2nd selection 1/8 final || Kazan, Russia || Decision || 4 ||  3:00 
|-
|-  bgcolor="#FFBBBB"
| 2015-12-19 || Loss ||align=left| Jan Soukup || Večer Bojovníků Thajského Boxu VII.|| Liberec, Czech Republic || Decision (Unanimous) || 3 || 3:00 
|-
|-  bgcolor="#CCFFCC"
| 2015-09-25 || Win ||align=left| Elmir Mehić || WFL: Bosnia || Laktaši, Bosnia and Herzegovina || Decision (Split) || 3 ||  3:00 

|-
|-
| colspan=9 | Legend:    

|-  bgcolor="#CCFFCC" 
| 2015-02-08 || Win ||align=left| Mohammed Balli || Muay Thai Centre Clyde van Dams || Netherlands || Decision || 3 ||  1:30
|-
|-  bgcolor="#CCFFCC" 
| 2014-12-14 || Win ||align=left| Mohamed Gabri || Maxifit/Mejiro Wormer gala || Netherlands || Decision || 3 ||  1:30
|-
|-  bgcolor="#CCFFCC" 
| 2014-10-18 || Win ||align=left| Marwin Gietmann || MTBG Ruble Event 15  || Netherlands || Decision || 3 ||  1:30
|-
|-  bgcolor="#CCFFCC" 
| 2014-10-05 || Win ||align=left| Fabio Brent || Go Hard Or Go Home 7  || Tilburg, Netherlands || Decision || 3 ||  1:30
|-
! style=background:white colspan=9 |
|-
|-
| colspan=9 | Legend:

See also 
List of male kickboxers

References

Living people
1997 births
Surinamese male kickboxers
Glory kickboxers
Sportspeople from Paramaribo
Light heavyweight kickboxers
Heavyweight kickboxers

External links
Profile at Glory